U Coronae Borealis (U CrB) is an Algol-type eclipsing binary star system in the constellation Corona Borealis. Its apparent magnitude varies between 7.66 and 8.79 over a period of 3.45 days. The component stars are a blue-white main sequence star of spectral type B6V and a cooler yellow-white subgiant star of spectral type F8III-IV.

References

Corona Borealis
Coronae Borealis, U
136175
074881
Durchmusterung objects
Algol variables
B-type main-sequence stars
F-type giants